In enzymology, a pyruvate, water dikinase is an enzyme that catalyzes the chemical reaction

ATP + pyruvate + H2O  AMP + phosphoenolpyruvate + phosphate

The 3 substrates of this enzyme are ATP, pyruvate, and H2O, whereas its 3 products are AMP, phosphoenolpyruvate, and phosphate.

This enzyme belongs to the family of transferases, to be specific, those transferring phosphorus-containing groups (phosphotransferases) with paired acceptors (dikinases). The systematic name of this enzyme class is ATP:pyruvate, water phosphotransferase. Other names in common use include phosphoenolpyruvate synthase, pyruvate-water dikinase (phosphorylating), PEP synthetase, phoephoenolpyruvate synthetase, phosphoenolpyruvic synthase, and phosphopyruvate synthetase.  This enzyme participates in pyruvate metabolism and reductive carboxylate cycle ( fixation).  It employs one cofactor, manganese.

Structural studies

As of late 2007, only one structure has been solved for this class of enzymes, with the PDB accession code .

References

 
 
 
 

EC 2.7.9
Manganese enzymes
Enzymes of known structure